The Waikerie Football Club is an Australian rules football club which compete in the Riverland Football League. The club was formed in 1908 and was a foundation member of the Mid Murray FL in 1910. It split into two teams in 1927 only to reform in 1929 and entered the Upper Murray "A" grade competition.

Premierships
1911, 1912, 1913, 1926, 1934, 1936, 1974, 1991, 1993, 1994, 2001, 2003, 2005, 2007, 2014, 2016, 2017, 2018

Notable players

 Russell Ebert
Mark Ricciuto
 Brad Helbig
 Luke Jericho

Books
 The encyclopedia of South Australian Country Football Clubs.  Peter Lines

References

External links 
 Official AFL Website
 RFL League Website

Australian rules football clubs established in 1908
1908 establishments in Australia
Australian rules football clubs in South Australia